Severomorsk-2 (also Safonovo-1 (USSR), Murmansk Northeast (US)) is a naval air base in Murmansk Oblast, Russia located 7 km southwest of Severomorsk and just 11 km northeast of Murmansk.  

The primary operator of Severomorsk-2 (after 1965 Safonvo-1) was 403 ODLAP (403rd Independent Long Range Aviation Regiment) operating Beriev Be-12PS search and rescue aircraft. It is a relatively small airfield compared to nearby Severomorsk-1, and was shut down in 1998. 

The base was home to the:
 38th Independent Shipborne Anti-Submarine Helicopter Regiment between 1981 and 1993.
 912th Independent Transport Aviation Regiment until 1960
 830th Independent Shipborne Anti-Submarine Helicopter Regiment between 1960 and 2001.
 524th Fighter Aviation Regiment VVS VMF between 1952 and 1960.

In mid-2022, Admiral Aleksandr Alekseyevich Moiseyev announced that the air base would be reconstructed.

References

External links
RussianAirFields.com

Russian Naval Aviation
Soviet Naval Aviation bases
Installations of the Russian Navy